Steve Diet Goedde (born Steven Paul Goedde on February 20, 1965) is an American fetish photographer.

"Diet" is a nickname from "Coma Diet," a past musical project.

According to one reviewer, Goedde's photos "are what Ansel Adams might have made if he were into S&M."

Monograph books
Phovella (DietWrite Publications, Chicago, 1994)
The Beauty of Fetish (Edition Stemmle, Zurich, 1998) 
The Beauty of Fetish: Volume 2 (Edition Stemmle, Zurich, 2001) 
ARRANGEMENTS: Volume III (Century Guild, Los Angeles, 2015)
Upcoming Untitled Book (Circa Press, London)

Other Media 

 Living Through Steve Diet Goedde DVD (SlishPix, Los Angeles, 2005)
 GoeddeConcerto CD (ReadyMade Music, Nice France, 2009) Music by Robert Waechter.

Solo Gallery and Museum Shows 
2018

  • Collaboration (with painter Alex Couwenberg), Coagula Curatorial, Los Angeles CA

2016

  • ARRANGEMENTS, Century Guild, Culver City CA

  • Instances, Garboushian Gallery, Beverly Hills CA

  • VARIATIONS, Sin City Gallery, Las Vegas NV

2013

  • The Modern Vintage, The Landmark, Hong Kong China

2012

  • New Works, Sin City Gallery, Las Vegas NV

2011

  • Dream Menagerie, Sin City Gallery, Las Vegas NV

2010

  • Intimate Captures, Sugar Lilie dessous prives, Los Angeles CA

2002

  • New Work 2002, Madame S Gallery, San Francisco CA

2000

  • Photographs from the American West, Feitico Gallery, Chicago IL

1994

  • Some Folks Call It a Sling Blade (one-night-show featuring Goedde's photography for the making of the critically acclaimed short film "Some Folks Call It a Sling Blade"), St. Louis Art Museum, St. Louis MO

References

External links

 Official website
 
 Living Through Steve Diet Goedde DVD website
 DeviantArt account

1965 births
Living people
Fetish photographers
School of the Art Institute of Chicago alumni
American erotic photographers